Volant is a brand of ski equipment, currently owned by Amer Sports. It was founded as an independent company in the US, by brothers Hank and Bucky Kashiwa in 1989. The brothers developed the stainless steel "cap" ski, and founded the company with the belief that stainless steel skis would provide better performance than skis made from other materials.

In 2001, Volant production was moved from Wheat Ridge, Colorado to Atomic's Altenmarkt factory in Austria on an OEM basis. In 2003, the Volant brand was acquired by Amer Group, LLC (the parent company of Atomic, and several other brands of sporting equipment).

Volant purchased Aggression Snowboards in 1994, in order to acquire a snowboard manufacturing facility.  A steel capped snowboard was introduced to the Aggression line (the Aggression Steel) initially.  In the following season, Volant introduced its own line of snowboards and shifted the steel capped boards to the Volant line.  Volant purchased Limited Snowboards, bringing their president to Wheat Ridge but continuing to produce the Limited line in Canada.  Volant was still not profitable due to continuing problems achieving economies of scale with the steel top caps.  Costs issues were further heightened with the opening of eastern Europe and globalization of the industry.  An average of 4.5 hours of labour spent on each pair of skis could not be justified.  Meanwhile, the primary investor's stock portfolio was taking a beating due to the Dot Com bust and he no longer desired to keep pumping money into the haemorrhaging company.  The doors were ordered closed and the brand sold.

References

Ski equipment manufacturers
Companies based in Jefferson County, Colorado
Wheat Ridge, Colorado